Lasek may refer to:

Acronyms
LASEK or photorefractive keratectomy, a laser eye surgery technique

Settlements

Villages and hamlets
Lasek, Lower Silesian Voivodeship (south-west Poland)
Lasek, Kuyavian-Pomeranian Voivodeship (north-central Poland)
Lasek, Łódź Voivodeship (central Poland)
Lasek, Lesser Poland Voivodeship (south Poland)
Lasek, Gostynin County in Masovian Voivodeship (east-central Poland)
Lasek, Grodzisk Mazowiecki County in Masovian Voivodeship (east-central Poland)
Lasek, Otwock County in Masovian Voivodeship (east-central Poland)
Lasek, Pomeranian Voivodeship (north Poland) (pl)
Lasek, Kraśnik County in Lublin Voivodeship (east Poland)
Lasek, Łuków County in Lublin Voivodeship (east Poland)

Districts
Lasek, a district of Luboń
Lasek, a district of Piwniczna-Zdrój
Lasek, a district of Tyczyn

Persons
Bucky Lasek, American skateboarder

See also
Lazek (disambiguation)
Lasix (furosemide)